Bradyrhizobium pachyrhizi is a bacterium from the genus of Bradyrhizobium which was isolated from nodules of Pachyrhizus erosus in Guanacaste in Costa Rica.

References

External links
Type strain of Bradyrhizobium pachyrhizi at BacDive -  the Bacterial Diversity Metadatabase

Nitrobacteraceae
Bacteria described in 2009